In software engineering, dependency injection is a design pattern in which an object or function receives other objects or functions that it depends on. A form of inversion of control, dependency injection aims to separate the concerns of constructing objects and using them, leading to loosely coupled programs. The pattern ensures that an object or function which wants to use a given service should not have to know how to construct those services. Instead, the receiving 'client' (object or function) is provided with its dependencies by external code (an 'injector'), which it is not aware of. Dependency injection helps by making implicit dependencies explicit and helps solve the following problems:
 How can a class be independent from the creation of the objects it depends on?
 How can an application, and the objects it uses support different configurations?
 How can the behavior of a piece of code be changed without editing it directly?
In addition, dependency injection is used for keeping code in-line with the dependency inversion principle.

Fundamentally, dependency injection consists of passing parameters to a method.

Because the client does not build or find the service itself, it typically only needs to declare the interfaces of the services it uses, rather than their concrete implementations. This makes it easier to change which services are actually used at runtime, especially in statically-typed languages where changing the underlying objects would otherwise require re-compiling the source code.

An example of inversion of control without dependency injection is the template method pattern, where polymorphism is achieved through subclassing. In contrast, dependency injection implements inversion of control through composition, and is often similar to the strategy pattern. A difference is that the strategy pattern is intended for dependencies that are interchangeable throughout an object's lifetime, whereas with dependency injection typically only a single instance of a dependency is used.

Roles 

Dependency injection involves four roles: services, clients, interfaces and injectors.

Services and clients 
A service is any class which contains useful functionality. In turn, a client is any class which uses services.

Any object can be a service or a client; the names relate only to the role the objects play in an injection. The same object may even be both a client (it uses injected services) and a service (it is injected into other objects). Upon injection, the service is made part of the client's state, available for use.

Interfaces 
Clients should not know how their dependencies are implemented, only their names and API. A service which retrieves emails, for instance, may use the IMAP or POP3 protocols behind the scenes, but this detail is likely irrelevant to calling code that merely wants an email retrieved. By ignoring implementation details, clients do not need to change when their dependencies do.

Injectors 
The injector, sometimes also called an assembler, container, provider or factory, introduces services to the client. 

The role of injectors is to construct and connect complex object graphs, where objects may be both clients and services. The injector itself may be many objects working together, but must not be the client, as this would create a circular dependency.

Because dependency injection separates how objects are constructed from how they are used, it often diminishes the importance of the new keyword found in most object-oriented languages. Because the framework handles creating services, the programmer tends to only directly construct value objects which represents entities in the program's domain (such as an Employee object in a business app or an Order object in a shopping app).

Analogy 
As an analogy, cars can be thought of as services which perform the useful work of transporting people from one place to another. Car engines can require gas, diesel or electricity, but this detail is unimportant to the client—a driver—who only cares if it can get them to their destination.  

Cars present a uniform interface through their pedals, steering wheels and other controls. As such, which engine they were 'injected' with on the factory line ceases to matter and drivers can switch between any kind of car as needed.

Advantages and disadvantages

Advantages 
A basic benefit of dependency injection is decreased coupling between classes and their dependencies. 

By removing a client's knowledge of how its dependencies are implemented, programs become more reusable, testable and maintainable. 

This also results in increased flexibility: a client may act on anything that supports the intrinsic interface the client expects.

More generally, dependency injection reduces boilerplate code, since all dependency creation is handled by a singular component.

Finally, dependency injection allows concurrent development. Two developers can independently develop classes that use each other, while only needing to know the interface the classes will communicate through. Plugins are often developed by third-parties that never even talk to developers of the original product.

Testing 
Many of dependency injection's benefits are particularly relevant to unit-testing.

For example, dependency injection can be used to externalize a system's configuration details into configuration files, allowing the system to be reconfigured without recompilation. Separate configurations can be written for different situations that require different implementations of components. 

Similarly, because dependency injection does not require any change in code behavior, it can be applied to legacy code as a refactoring. This makes clients more independent and are easier to unit test in isolation, using stubs or mock objects, that simulate other objects not under test. 

This ease of testing is often the first benefit noticed when using dependency injection.

Disadvantages 
Critics of dependency injection argue that it:
 Creates clients that demand configuration details, which can be onerous when obvious defaults are available.
 Makes code difficult to trace because it separates behavior from construction.
 Is typically implemented with reflection or dynamic programming, hindering IDE automation.
 Typically requires more upfront development effort.
 Encourages dependence on a framework.

Types of dependency injection 
There are three main ways in which a client can receive injected services:
 Constructor injection, where dependencies are provided through a client's class constructor.
 Setter injection, where the client exposes a setter method which accepts the dependency.
 Interface injection, where the dependency's interface provides an injector method that will inject the dependency into any client passed to it.

In some frameworks, clients do not need to actively accept dependency injection at all. In Java, for example, reflection can make private attributes public when testing and inject services directly.

Without dependency injection 
In the following Java example, the Client class contains a Service member variable initialized in the constructor. The client directly constructs and controls which service it uses, creating a hard-coded dependency.

public class Client {
    private Service service;

    Client() {
        // The dependency is hard-coded.
        this.service = new ExampleService();
    }
}

Constructor injection 
The most common form of dependency injection is for a class to request its dependencies through its constructor. This ensures the client is always in a valid state, since it cannot be instantiated without its necessary dependencies.   
public class Client {
    private Service service;

    // The dependency is injected through a constructor.
    Client(Service service) {
        if (service == null) {
            throw new InvalidParameterException("service must not be null");
        }
        this.service = service;
    }
}

Setter injection 
By accepting dependencies through a setter method, rather than a constructor, clients can allow injectors to manipulate their dependencies at any time. This offers flexibility, but makes it difficult to ensure that all dependencies are injected and valid before the client is used.   

public class Client {
    private Service service;

    // The dependency is injected through a setter method.
    public void setService(Service service) {
        if (service == null) {
            throw new InvalidParameterException("service must not be null");
        }
        this.service = service;
    }
}

Interface injection 
With interface injection, dependencies are completely ignorant of their clients, yet still send and receive references to new clients.

In this way, the dependencies become injectors. The key is that the injecting method is provided through an interface.

An assembler is still needed to introduce the client and its dependencies. The assembler takes a reference to the client, casts it to the setter interface that sets that dependency, and passes it to that dependency object which in turn passes a reference to itself back to the client.

For interface injection to have value, the dependency must do something in addition to simply passing back a reference to itself. This could be acting as a factory or sub-assembler to resolve other dependencies, thus abstracting some details from the main assembler. It could be reference-counting so that the dependency knows how many clients are using it. If the dependency maintains a collection of clients, it could later inject them all with a different instance of itself.

public interface ServiceSetter {
    public void setService(Service service);
}

public class Client implements ServiceSetter {
    private Service service;

    @Override
    public void setService(Service service) {
        if (service == null) {
            throw new InvalidParameterException("service must not be null");
        }
        this.service = service;
    }
}

public class ServiceInjector {
	private Set<ServiceSetter> clients;

	public void inject(ServiceSetter client) {
		this.clients.add(client);
		client.setService(new ExampleService());
	}

	public void switch() {
		for (Client client : this.clients) {
			client.setService(new AnotherExampleService());
		}
	}
}

public class ExampleService implements Service {}

public class AnotherExampleService implements Service {}

Assembly 
The simplest way of implementing dependency injection is to manually arrange services and clients, typically done at the program's root, where execution begins.

public class Program {

    public static void main(String[] args) {
        // Build the service.
        Service service = new ExampleService();

        // Inject the service into the client.
        Client client = new Client(service);

        // Use the objects.
        System.out.println(client.greet());
    }	
}

Manual construction may be more complex and involve builders, factories, or other construction patterns.

Frameworks 

Manual dependency injection is often tedious and error-prone for larger projects, promoting the use of frameworks which automate the process. Manual dependency injection becomes a dependency injection framework once the constructing code is no longer custom to the application and is instead universal. While useful, these tools are not required to do dependency injection.

Some frameworks, like Spring, can use external configuration files to plan program composition:

import org.springframework.beans.factory.BeanFactory;
import org.springframework.context.ApplicationContext;
import org.springframework.context.support.ClassPathXmlApplicationContext;

public class Injector {

	public static void main(String[] args) {
		// Details about which concrete service to use are stored in configuration separate from the program itself.
		BeanFactory beanfactory = new ClassPathXmlApplicationContext("Beans.xml");
		Client client = (Client) beanfactory.getBean("client");
		System.out.println(client.greet());
	}
}

Even with a potentially long and complex object graph, the only class mentioned in code is the entry point, in this case Client.Client has not undergone any changes to work with Spring and remains a POJO. By keeping Spring-specific annotations and calls from spreading out among many classes, the system stays only loosely dependent on Spring.

Examples

AngularJS 
The following example shows an AngularJS component receiving a greeting service through dependency injection.

function SomeClass(greeter) {
  this.greeter = greeter;
}

SomeClass.prototype.doSomething = function(name) {
  this.greeter.greet(name);
}

Each AngularJS application contains a service locator responsible for the construction and look-up of dependencies.

// Provide the wiring information in a module
var myModule = angular.module('myModule', []);

// Teach the injector how to build a greeter service. 
// greeter is dependent on the $window service.
myModule.factory('greeter', function($window) {
  return {
    greet: function(text) {
      $window.alert(text);
    }
  };
});

We can then create a new injector that provides components defined in the myModule module, including the greeter service.

var injector = angular.injector(['myModule', 'ng']);
var greeter = injector.get('greeter');

To avoid the service locator antipattern, AngularJS allows declarative notation in HTML templates which delegates creating components to the injector.

<div ng-controller="MyController">
  <button ng-click="sayHello()">Hello</button>
</div>
function MyController($scope, greeter) {
  $scope.sayHello = function() {
    greeter.greet('Hello World');
  };
}

The ng-controller directive triggers the injector to create an instance of the controller and its dependencies.

C# 
This sample provides an example of constructor injection in C#.
using System;

namespace DependencyInjection;

// Our client will only know about this interface, not which specific gamepad it is using.
interface IGamepadFunctionality {
    string GetGamepadName();
    void SetVibrationPower(float InPower);
}

// The following services provide concrete implementations of the above interface.

class XBoxGamepad : IGamepadFunctionality {
    float VibrationPower = 1.0f;
    
    public string GetGamepadName() => "Xbox controller";
    
    public void SetVibrationPower(float InPower) => VibrationPower = Math.Clamp(InPower, 0.0f, 1.0f);
}

class PlaystationJoystick : IGamepadFunctionality {
    float VibratingPower = 100.0f;
    
    public string GetGamepadName() => "PlayStation controller";
    
    public void SetVibrationPower(float InPower) => VibratingPower = Math.Clamp(InPower * 100.0f, 0.0f, 100.0f);
}

class SteamController : IGamepadFunctionality {
    double Vibrating = 1.0;
    
    public string GetGamepadName() => "Steam controller";
    
    public void SetVibrationPower(float InPower) => Vibrating = Convert.ToDouble(Math.Clamp(InPower, 0.0f, 1.0f));
}

// This class is the client which receives a service.
class Gamepad {
    IGamepadFunctionality _GamepadFunctionality;

    // The service is injected through the constructor and stored in the above field.
    public Gamepad(IGamepadFunctionality InGamepadFunctionality) => _GamepadFunctionality = InGamepadFunctionality;

    public void Showcase() {
        // The injected service is used.
        var gamepadName = _GamepadFunctionality.GetGamepadName();
        var message = $"We're using the {gamepadName} right now, do you want to change the vibrating power?";
        Console.WriteLine(message);
    }
}

class Program {
    static void Main() {
        var steamController = new SteamController();
        
        // We could have also passed in an XboxController, PlaystationJoystick, etc.
        // The gamepad doesn't know what it's using and doesn't need to.
        var gamepad = new Gamepad(steamController);
        
        gamepad.Showcase();
    }
}

See also 
 Architecture description language
 Factory pattern
 Inversion of control
 Plug-in (computing)
 Strategy pattern
 AngularJS
 Service locator pattern
 Parameter (computer programming)
 Quaject

References

External links 

 Composition Root by Mark Seemann
 A beginners guide to Dependency Injection
 Dependency Injection & Testable Objects: Designing loosely coupled and testable objects - Jeremy Weiskotten; Dr. Dobb's Journal, May 2006.
 Design Patterns: Dependency Injection -- MSDN Magazine, September 2005
 Martin Fowler's original article that introduced the term Dependency Injection
 P of EAA: Plugin
 The Rich Engineering Heritage Behind Dependency Injection - Andrew McVeigh - A detailed history of dependency injection.
 What is Dependency Injection? - An alternative explanation - Jakob Jenkov
 Writing More Testable Code with Dependency Injection -- Developer.com, October 2006 
 Managed Extensibility Framework Overview -- MSDN
 Old fashioned description of the Dependency Mechanism by Hunt 1998 
 Refactor Your Way to a Dependency Injection Container
 Understanding DI in PHP
 You Don't Need a Dependency Injection Container

Component-based software engineering
Software architecture
Software design patterns
Articles with example Java code